Oratory Preparatory School, commonly known as Oratory Prep, is a Roman Catholic college preparatory day school for boys in grades 7-12, located in Summit, in Union County, New Jersey, United States, approximately  west of Manhattan.  The school is located one block away from the Kent Place School and is in close proximity to Summit High School.

The school is associated with the Roman Catholic Archdiocese of Newark. Oratory Preparatory School is a member of the New Jersey Association of Independent Schools. The school has been accredited by the Middle States Association of Colleges and Schools Commission on Elementary and Secondary Schools since 1973.

As of the 2017–18 school year, the school had an enrollment of 373 students and 36.6 classroom teachers (on an FTE basis), for a student–teacher ratio of 10.2:1. The school's student body was 80.7% (301) White, 6.2% (23) Hispanic, 5.9% (22) Asian, 4.0% (15) two or more races and 2.9% (11) Black.

The school was founded in 1907 as Carlton Academy, with grades 4-12.  Most of the students lived on campus. Due to the school's relatively small size, students in a given grade are not individually ranked.  Oratory is home to young men from more than 70 communities in the New York metro area.  Tuition for the 2022–23 academic year is $25,400 and a $300 registration fee is required; this does not include costs for transportation, books and meals. Each year 100% of Oratory seniors are accepted to four-year colleges.

Awards, recognition and rankings
In 2015, the United States Department of Education announced that Oratory had been recognized with the National Blue Ribbon School Award of Excellence, the Education Department's highest honor. Oratory was one of 15 schools in the state and one of two private secondary schools across the nation to receive this distinction.

History
Though the school is named Oratory, it does not have any connection to the Oratorian Fathers. However, there may have been an association in the past, as advertisements for the school in The New York Times during the 1910s mention the Oratorian Fathers. The reason for the name change is said to be that the school wanted to attract Oratorian Priests, however this plan proved to be unsuccessful.  Oratory was founded as an exclusive boarding school serving boys in grades 4 through 12, although in 1964 it became strictly a day school.

Oratory originally resided on a  lot, but was reduced to its current ten after selling off a portion of land in the 1960s. In 1967, the school was sold to the Archdiocese of Newark after running into financial difficulties. Among century-old specimen trees and rolling hills, the campus consists of two main academic buildings, athletic fields, and a prayer garden.  Around the start of the 21st century, the campus was conversationally referred to as "The Park" by Summit residents because it had various athletic fields, intricate lamp posts, its own irrigation system, and a small pond that was used for skating during the winter season.  The Fr. John J. Bain Academic building, built in 1959, contains classrooms, gymnasium, computer lab, and chemistry lab.  Oratory's Cavalero Memorial Field, an artificial turf field constructed in 2010, hosts a baseball diamond as well as Northern New Jersey's largest high school soccer field. 

In 2006, the land was assessed at $6,270,000, and the buildings at $2,752,700, a total of $9,022,700.

Athletics
The Oratory Prep Rams compete in the Union County Interscholastic Athletic Conference, following a reorganization of sports leagues in Northern New Jersey by the New Jersey State Interscholastic Athletic Association (NJSIAA). Prior to the NJSIAA's 2009 realignment, the school had participated in the Mountain Valley Conference, which included public and private high schools in Essex County, Somerset County and Union County. With 500 students in grades 10-12, the school was classified by the NJSIAA for the 2019–20 school year as Non-Public A for most athletic competition purposes, which included schools with an enrollment of 381 to 1,454 students in that grade range (equivalent to Group II for public schools).

The boys track team won the indoor track Non-Public Group B state championship in 1980.  The boys' track team won the Non-Public indoor relay state championship in 1980.  The spring track team won the New Jersey Prep B Championship two years running (2009 and 2010). The track team won the inaugural winter track Prep B championship in February 2011.

The boys cross country running team won the Non-Public Group C state championship in 1974 (as co-champion) and 1975.

Oratory Golf's home course is Canoe Brook Country Club. The golf team was NJSIAA Non Public B State Champions in 2004-05, and won the NJSIAA Prep B state championship in 2005-06.  For the 2006 season, the Oratory golf team was ranked 20th in the state by The Star-Ledger. Steve Zychowski won the state and Mount Valley tournaments and helped lead the golf team to a win in the NJSIAA Parochial B tournament in 2009.

For 14 consecutive years through 2009, the swim team won the Mountain Valley Conference and won the NJ Prep B Championship in 2004. The cross country team was the NJISAA Prep B State Champions in 2004, and has continually placed first in the conference for the past ten years.  The team is led by Coach E.J. Cronin, who is also the junior varsity baseball coach.  The varsity baseball team were conference champions in 2006, a feat not accomplished since 1956, and had a perfect in-conference record of 12-0.

Mock Trial
The mock trial team, sponsored by the New Jersey State Bar Foundation, began at Oratory in 2003.  In 2006, 2007, 2012, 2015, 2016 and 2018, the team won the state regional final championship, and in 2007 the team won the state semifinals, finishing third in the state, and in 2016 finished 2nd in the state. The team has won the Union County Championship 13 years, including the past eight years. In 2007 the team qualified for the American Mock Trial Invitational held in New Jersey. There the team won two of three trials and finished fifth in the nation. The team was coached by Bill Martin, Director of Student Activities, since the team's inception. In 2012, the team won the state championship, marking the first time that a school from Union county had won the state championship.

Noted alumni
 Richard Codey (born 1946), former Governor of New Jersey.
 Danny DeVito (born 1944), actor.
 Justin Brice Guariglia, photographer for National Geographic Magazine.
 William J. Lyons Jr. (1921-2014), businessman and politician who served from 1973 to 1975 in the Connecticut Senate.

Gallery

References

External links 
Oratory Preparatory School website
Data for Oratory Preparatory School, National Center for Education Statistics

1907 establishments in New Jersey
Boys' schools in New Jersey
Educational institutions established in 1907
New Jersey Association of Independent Schools
Private high schools in Union County, New Jersey
Private middle schools in New Jersey
Roman Catholic Archdiocese of Newark
Catholic secondary schools in New Jersey
Summit, New Jersey